Diotima may refer to:

People
 Diotima of Mantinea, an ancient female philosopher and tutor of Socrates
 Pen-name of Esme Wynn-Tyson, British author.
 Pseudonym of Susette Borkenstein Gontard in poetry by Friedrich Hölderlin
 Pseudonym of Ermelinda Tuzzi, a protagonist in Robert Musil's novel The Man Without Qualities

Other
423 Diotima, an asteroid
Diotima (album), a 2011 album by experimental black metal band Krallice
Diotima (magazine), a Greek cultural and social magazine
Diotíma (website), a website on women and gender in the ancient world
Diotima (typeface), a typeface designed in 1954 by Gudrun Zapf von Hesse